The 2015 Rugby Europe Sevens Grand Prix Series was an Olympic qualification tournament for rugby sevens at the 2016 Summer Olympics which was held over three legs in the cities of Moscow, Lyon and Exeter. 

The top team qualified directly to the Olympic Games, whereas the runner-up qualified to the Final Olympic Qualification Tournament in 2016. France won the 2015 Rugby Europe Men's Sevens Championship, and qualified directly to the 2016 Summer Olympics. Spain finished second and qualified directly to the Final 2016 Men's Olympic Qualification Tournament, avoiding the Rugby Europe Repechage Tournament.

Schedule

Standings

Note Russia finishes above Germany due to tiebreaker of highest single tournament finish.

Moscow

Lyon

Exeter

See also
 2015 Rugby Europe Women's Sevens Grand Prix Series

References

Grand Prix
2015
2015 rugby sevens competitions
2015–16 in European rugby union
2014–15 in European rugby union
Rugby sevens at the 2016 Summer Olympics – Men's tournament